Algidus is a monotypic genus of spiders in the family Lycosidae. It was first described by Eugène Simon in 1898. , it contains only one species, Algidus marmoratus, found in Venezuela.

References

Lycosidae
Monotypic Araneomorphae genera
Spiders of South America